National FM, formerly Radio 4, is a state owned Zimbabwean radio station that broadcasts in 14 indigenous Zimbabwean languages.

The station is known for promoting each and every culture and language across the country. It was launched as the educational radio station in the early 80s by the state broadcaster and used to broadcast educational content. Lately, the station broadcasts predominantly in Shona and Ndebele. The other languages can be heard during news bulletins, not as frequent as the station claims.

It is now based in Harare, broadcasting across the country. Its target audience is mainly the rural community and the ones that prefer radio in local languages.

.

References

External links

Radio stations in Zimbabwe